Harisinga is a town in the Udalguri district in the north-eastern Indian state of Assam.  The district was formed when the administration of boro dominated areas came under the B.T.A.D.  It falls on the Bhergaon subdivision of Udalguri district; it has its own police station and post office from the past times itself.

Geography
Harisinga is surrounded on the north by the Bhutan hills of the Great Himalayan range, on the east by the brook Bikhaiti, and on the west by stream Bharla which has been making the region fertile throughout the ages.  Its daily market is located in the centre of the town which is the only way for retailing in the region.

Villages in Harisinga
 Harisinga No.1 Patti
 Harisinga No.2 Patti
 Mantikiri
 Niz Harisinga
 Kahibari
 Deulguri
 Baniapara
 Simoluguri, Harisinga
 Kothalguri
 NO. 2 Phasia
 NO. 1 Phasia
 Ambagaon
 Bengbari Nepali Basti
 Bengbari
 Batiamari
 Chomuapara
 Kahibari
 Landangchuburi
Dowdinigami

Weather
Like the North-Eastern Part of India, the weather is pleasant with winters not being that harsh and the rainy season in full swing from the month of March to August.

Festivals
Bihu or Bwisagu is the most celebrated festival and it falls in the month of April.  "Sri Krishna's Rash Mahutsav" is one of the largest festivals being celebrated in this area. It is usually celebrated in the month of November with full enthusiasm. It is usually celebrated for a period of 7 days. Populated with people of different religions, Christmas is also celebrated with full fervour. Many Churches are present in Harisinga and during Christmas, they are all beautifully decorated and late night hymns can be heard.

Educational institutions
 Harisinga Higher Secondary School
 Diamond English School
 Borigaon High School
 Sankardev Sishu Niketan
 Baniapara L.P. School
 Rajkhumbri English School
 St Pauls School
 Gr Kamfert School
 Harisinga College
 Harisinga Govt. Junior Basic LP School
 Kahibari LPS
 No. 1 Pasia LPS
 No. 1 Amjuli (EGS Upgraded)
 Mantikiri LP School
 Boukahola LP School
 Hoguma LP School
 Landangchuburi LP School
 Swrang Lama LPS (FA)
 Amjuli Bapuji Bodo LP School
 Amjuli Bapuji LP School
 No. 3 Amjuli L.P.S
 Amchiguri LP School
 Amjuli Barampur LP School
 Daudigaon MV
 Kundurbil Pathar Adibasi LP School
 Manza Nalbari LP School
 Nandanpur LP School
 No. 2 Amjuli Adarsha L.P.S
 No. 2 Amjuli Adibasi LP School
 No. 4 Amjuli Laxmipur LP School
 Uttur Nalbari LP School
 No. 2 Phasia LPS
 No. 862 Balipara LPS
 Bichar Chuburi  L.P.S
 Panimudi LP School
 Adola Kahilipara LP School
 No. 3 Panimudi Adibasi LP School
 Chamuapara LP School
 No. 3 Lissing L.P.S
 NC Ghagra Dangal Basti LP School
 No. 1 Ghagra Bishnujoyti LPS
 No. 2 Ghagra Baby Land LPS
 Nonke Amjuli LP School
 No. 2 Noke Kherkiria LPS
 Amlaiguri LPSchool
 Dibakar Adivasi  LPS (FA)
 Samtabari (EGS Upgraded)
 Sastrapara LP School
 N0. 1 Lising LP School
 No. 827 Edenbari LPS
 Amjuli Bhergaon LPS (FA)
 Amjuli Colony LP School
 No. 1 Amjuli Milopur (EGS)
 Majuli Basti LP School  
 Borigaon MES
 Silpota Batabari LP School
 Niz Harisinga Samaina
 No. 3 Panimudi LPS
 Borigaon Gvt. J.B.School
 Dwamakha  LPS 
 Dwarmakha Sautalibasti (EGS)
 Tamulbari Ballapara (EGS)
 No. 2 Gharaidack Bodo LPS
 Dhekiabari LPS
 No. 1 Kundurbil LP School
 Boscobari LP School
 Bhelagora LPS
 No. 875 Barongabari LPS
 Athgharia LPS (FA)
 No. 1 Barangabari LP School
 Kathalguri LPS
 Baniapara L.P.S
 Bangurung Anjalu LPS
 Binapani LP School
 Kherkheria LP School
 Uttar Harisinga LP School
 No. 2 Kundurbil LP School
 No. 3 Kundurbil Rupa LP School
 No. 1 Amjuli Dhangraj LPS
 Sastrapara ME School
 No.1 Amjuli Milanjoyti MES
 Edenbari MES.
 Kathalguri MES
 Harisinga HS School
 Irakdao MES
 Kundurbil ME School
 Amlaiguri MES
 Khasibari MES
 Daudigaon MVS
 Bengbari Nepali Basti L.P School
 Bengbari High School

Sankar dev shishu niketan, Diamond English School and Harisinga Higher Secondary school are situated in Harisinga which caters for the education needs of the local population. Many professionals from Harisinga are working in different fields all over India and many other countries. Writers and poets from Hrisinga have significant contribution to the Assamese and Boro literature. Sankardev shishu niketan and Diamond English School, Harisinga is well known for results in H.S.L.C examinations throughout the years of its formation.

History
Harisinga has a great historic importance.  The name Harisinga is said to come from (hari-singah); Hari means Lord Krishna and Singah means the ancient war horn.  It is believed that Lord Krishna rang his war horn from this very place during his fight with King of Sonitpur for the shake of love of his grandson Aniruddha with Usha the princess of Sonitpur. From that time onwards the name "Harisinga" originated. One of the oldest Churches built by British Missionary Rev. Sidny Endle is also located on the adjacent of Harisinga. Harisinga H.S. School was also built by the British missionaries.

Economy
Harisinga area has very fertile land suitable for agricultural production- mainly Rice, Maah (Lentil), Potato, Onion, Garlic, Ginger, Tomatoes, Cauliflower, Cabbage, Brinjal and other vegetables.  Different fruits like Banana, Berries, Mangoes, Coconuts, Tamol (Areca nuts) etc. are produced in abundance in the region. Fisheries play a significant role towards the socio-economic up-liftmen of the common people of Harisinga development block.  Tea cultivation plays a major loe of economy of this region; many youths are now engaged with tea cultivation for their livelihood.  Many multinational tea companies like Willimson Mager are placing emphasis on tea cultivation of the region.

Places of interest in Harisinga
Harisinga is the place of one of the biggest Sankardev satras in middle Assam which is well known to the satria (Neo-Vaishnavite) people of the state. Harisinga is also known for the biggest Bathow temple of Bathouism religion  situated at the heart of the beautiful town Harisinga. Nevertheless, Harisinga is also known for the B.B.C (Boro Baptist Convention) which is the HQ of its kind in the state.

Transport
Harisinga is well connected with rest of Assam through railway and roadways.  The nearest NH is NH52 at Rowta which is about 26 km from it. It had a small railway station named Harisinga railway station before which is now being upgraded to a big railway station of broad gauge capability with maximum number of train stoppages. Harisinga is only 17 km away from Udalguri and 13 km away from Tangla town. The nearest airport is Lokapriya Gopinath Bordoloi 
International Airport which is about 130 km from it.

Politics
Harisinga is part of Mangaldoi (Lok Sabha constituency).

69th Udalguri Assam Legislative Assembly - MLA 1968-2016 
. Rihon daimari 2016.    Won by 45960 votes
 Rihon Daimari - 2011           won by 40970 votes
 Rihon Daimari- 2006            won by 35560 votes
 Rihon Daimari -2001            won by 30170 votes
 Devo Kanto Ramchiari - 1996    won by 36798 votes
 Jamon Singh Brahma -1991       won by 28149 votes
 Binoy Kungur Basumotari - 1985 won by 24091 votes
 Binoy Kungur Basumotari - 1983 won by 19741 votes
 Binoy Kungur Basumotari - 1978 won by 17269 votes
 Bahadur Basumotari - 1972      won by 16470 votes
 Bahadur Basumotari - 1968      won by 10839 votes

References

External links
 Official Website of Udalguri District
 

Cities and towns in Udalguri district